The High School of Music & Art, informally known as "Music & Art" (or "M&A"), was a public specialized high school located at 443-465 West 135th Street in the borough of Manhattan, New York, from 1936 until 1984. In 1961, Music & Art and the High School of Performing Arts (est. 1947) were formed into a two-campus high school. The schools fully merged in 1984 into the Fiorello H. LaGuardia High School of Music & the Arts.

Colloquially known as "The Castle on the Hill," the building that once housed Music & Art is located in the Hamilton Heights neighborhood of Harlem, in the campus of the City College of New York across the street from St. Nicholas Park. The building now houses the A. Philip Randolph Campus High School, a magnet school of the New York City Department of Education.

History
New York City Mayor Fiorello H. LaGuardia started the high school in 1936, an event he described as "the most hopeful accomplishment" of his administration. As the mayor of New York City he wanted to establish a public school in which students could hone their talents in music, art and the performing arts. Music & Art was made up of three departments: Art, Instrumental Music, and Vocal Music. It was a magnet school, meant to draw talented students from all boroughs. In 1948, a sister school — the High School of Performing Arts — was created in an effort to harness students' talents in dance.

Future Mad magazine contributors Al Jaffee, Will Elder, Harvey Kurtzman, John Severin, and Al Feldstein all attended Music & Art together in the 1930s. Comic book artists Ross Andru and Mike Esposito, did as well, though they were slightly younger than Jaffee and the rest.

R. O. Blechman, Milton Glaser, Ed Sorel, and Reynold Ruffins — three of the four co-founders of the design firm Push Pin Studios — were M&A students in the 1940s. Other M&A graduates from the 1940s include Bess Myerson, Allan Kaprow, and Hal Linden.

Notable graduates from the 1950s included Gloria Davy, Diahann Carroll, Susan Stamberg, Billy Dee Williams, Peter Yarrow, Tony Roberts, James Burrows, Erica Jong, and Felix Pappalardi.

Notable M&A graduates from the 1960s include Peter Hyams, Steven Bochco, Robbie Conal, Graham Diamond, Maira Kalman, Bob Mankoff, Diane Noomin,  and Margot Adler; while notable graduates from the 1970s include musicians Paul Stanley and Kenny Washington.

Notable M&A grads from the 1980s include writers Jonathan Lethem and Lynn Nottage, and hip-hop musicians Slick Rick.

Merger with Performing Arts 
As per Mayor LaGuardia's vision, Music & Art and Performing Arts merged on paper in 1961 and were to be combined in one building. However, this took many years and it was not until 1984 that the sister schools were merged into a new school, the Fiorello H. LaGuardia High School of Music & Art and Performing Arts, at a new building designed by Eduardo Catalano in the Lincoln Square area of Manhattan.  The Board of Education posthumously honored Mayor LaGuardia by naming the new building after him.

Architectural significance
The 1924 gothic revival building was designed by William H. Gompert, Architect & Superintendent of School Buildings for the New York City Board of Education, to house the New York Training School for Teachers. The Training School became the New York Teachers Training College from 1931 to 1933. That school was abolished during the Depression when there was a surplus of teachers for the city's school system, and Mayor LaGuardia used the opportunity to create the High School of Music & Art.

Architecturally, the building blends in with the older gothic revival buildings of the City College campus, designed by architect George B. Post around 1900 to create a setting that came to be known as "the poor man's Harvard."

Music & Art students and graduates often referred to the building as "The Castle on the hill," a reference to the design of its gothic towers, and the decorative gargoyles done in a quirky and playful style that the Landmarks Commission report describes as "finials in the shape of creatures bearing shields." The tower rooms have dramatic acoustics, which Music & Art used as choral practice rooms. The large gymnasium features large Tudor-arch-shaped windows on two sides that at certain times during the day stream sunlight into the room. The auditorium has excellent acoustics, and features diamond-shaped amber windows that during daylight cast a warm glow on its dark wood interior. The iron ends of the auditorium seats have a casting with an image of the Tudor window arches in the gymnasium.

The building won status as a landmark by the New York City Landmarks Preservation Commission in 1997. According to the Landmark Commission report, this was not an expensive building for its time, and many of the structural components (like the staircase bracings in the stairwell) were left exposed to save money. Yet much thought went into humanizing the space and creating a good environment for learning, with plenty of natural light and air, expansive collaborative spaces, and much playful decoration thrown in for good measure:

Notable alumni
 Note: anyone who graduated after 1984 is considered a graduate of Fiorello H. LaGuardia High School, not Music & Art

 Margot Adler (1964), radio journalist
 Ross Andru (c. 1940), comic book artist
 Eleanor Antin (1952), artist
 Louis Abolafia (1958), artist, presidential candidate, and countercultural figure
 Stanley Aronowitz, academic and activist
 Ray Billingsley (c. 1974) — cartoonist, creator of the syndicated comic strip Curtis
 R. O. Blechman (c. 1948), animator, illustrator, children's-book author, and cartoonist 
 Steven Bochco (1961), TV producer & writer
 Frank Bolle, cartoonist
 Steven Brower (1970), designer and author
 James Burrows (1958), director
 Harriet Camen (1946), ceramics artist
 Diahann Carroll (1953), singer
 Jerome Charyn (1955), novelist 
 Kvitka Cisyk (1970), singer
 Billy Cobham (1962), jazz drummer
 Gil Coggins, jazz pianist and composer
 Sal Cuevas (1972), bassist
 Kenny Drew, jazz pianist
 Robbie Conal (1961), artist
 Gloria Davy (1951), operatic soprano
 Gemze de Lappe (1939), dancer
 Graham Diamond (1963), speculative fiction writer
 Will Elder (1940), cartoonist
 Alvin Epstein (1943), actor and director
 Mike Esposito (c. 1940), comic book artist
 Al Feldstein, cartoonist and editor
 Bela Fleck (1976) banjo player
 Charles Fox (1958) composer
 Peter Freeman, multi-instrumentalist, bassist and music composer
 Gerald Fried, composer, conductor, and oboist
 Dave Gantz (c. 1939), cartoonist
Lenora Garfinkel (1930-2020), architect
 Milton Glaser (1947), designer
 Andy González (1968), bassist
 Jerry González (1967), bandleader, trumpeter
 Christopher Guest (~1966), screenwriter, actor, director, composer
 Charles Gwathmey (1956), architect
 Larry Harlow (musician) (1957), pianist, composer
 Peter Hyams (1960), director
 Al Jaffee (1940), cartoonist
 Erica Jong (1959), author
 Maira Kalman (1967), illustrator, writer, artist, and designer
 Michael Kamen (1965), composer
 Susan Kamil, book editor and publisher
 Allan Kaprow (1945), painter and performance artist
Amy A. Kass, educator and anthologist
 Everett Raymond Kinstler, artist, Portrait painter
 James Howard Kunstler (1966), author, social critic
 Harvey Kurtzman (1941), cartoonist, creator of Mad Magazine
 Paul Lansky (1961), composer
 Michael Lax (1947), industrial designer
 Jonathan Lethem (1982), author
 Shari Lewis (née Sonia Phyllis Hurwitz) (c. 1951) actress, puppeteer
 Hal Linden (1948), actor
 Bob Mankoff (1962), cartoonist and long-time The New Yorker magazine cartoon editor
 Ray Marcano, medical reporter and music critic
 William A. Moses, real estate developer
 Bess Myerson (1941), actress and politician
 Diane Noomin (c. 1964), cartoonist
 Lynn Nottage (1982), playwright
 Laura Nyro (née Nigro), (1965), singer/songwriter
 Frank J. Oteri (1981), composer and music journalist
 Brock Peters, actor
 Margaret Ponce Israel painter and ceramist
 Nancy B. Reich musicologist
 Slick Rick (1983), hip-hop musician
 Joshua Rifkin (1961), conductor and musicologist
 Tony Roberts (1957), actor
 Arlen Roth (1969) Guitarist, author, singer
 Reynold Ruffins (1948), designer
 Bernard Safran (1939), illustrator, artist
 Ed Seeman cartoonist, cinematographer, photographer, abstract artist, movie director
 John Severin (1940), cartoonist
 Jeremy J. Shapiro (1957), critical theorist
 Joel Shatzky (1943- 2020), writer and literary professor 
 Robert Siegel (1957), architect
 Ed Sorel (c. 1947), illustrator and cartoonist
 Susan Stamberg (1955), radio journalist
 Paul Stanley (1970), musician
 Jeremy Steig (1960), improvising flutist
 Daniel Stern (1946), writer, musician 
 Steve Stiles (c. 1960), cartoonist 
 Susan Strasberg (1956), actress
 Beth Ames Swartz, artist
 Richard Taruskin (1961), music historian
 Dave Valentin (1969), Latin jazz flutist
 Daniel Waitzman (1961), flutist and composer
 Kenny Washington (1976), jazz musician
 Billy Dee Williams (1955), actor
 Peter Yarrow (1955), singer/songwriter
 Sherman Yellen (1949) playwright, memoirist
 Kristi Zea (1966) production designer

References

External links 
Website of the Alumni & Friends of LaGuardia High School of Music & the Arts
1977 New York City Landmarks Preservation Commission Report on the old High School of Music & Art Building that now houses the A. Philip Randolph Campus High School (pdf-format file).
MyCastleTreasures.com a tribute to the alumni of the High School of Music and Art

High School of Music and Art
Art schools in New York City
Defunct high schools in Manhattan
Music schools in New York City
Alternative schools in the United States
1936 establishments in New York City

New York City Designated Landmarks in Manhattan